This is a timeline of category theory and related mathematics. Its scope ("related mathematics") is taken as:
 Categories of abstract algebraic structures including representation theory and universal algebra;
 Homological algebra;
 Homotopical algebra;
 Topology using categories, including algebraic topology, categorical topology, quantum topology, low-dimensional topology;
 Categorical logic and set theory in the categorical context such as algebraic set theory;
 Foundations of mathematics building on categories, for instance topos theory;
 Abstract geometry, including algebraic geometry, categorical noncommutative geometry, etc.
 Quantization related to category theory, in particular categorical quantization;
 Categorical physics relevant for mathematics.

In this article, and in category theory in general, ∞ = ω.

Timeline to 1945: before the definitions

1945–1970

1971–1980

1981–1990

1991–2000

2001–present

See also
 EGA
 FGA
 SGA

Notes

References
 nLab, just as a higher-dimensional Wikipedia, started in late 2008; see nLab
 Zhaohua Luo; Categorical geometry homepage
 John Baez, Aaron Lauda; A prehistory of n-categorical physics
 Ross Street; An Australian conspectus of higher categories
 Elaine Landry, Jean-Pierre Marquis; Categories in context: historical, foundational, and philosophical
 Jim Stasheff; A survey of cohomological physics
 John Bell; The development of categorical logic
 Jean Dieudonné; The historical development of algebraic geometry
 Charles Weibel; History of homological algebra
 Peter Johnstone; The point of pointless topology
 
 George Whitehead; Fifty years of homotopy theory
 Haynes Miller; The origin of sheaf theory

Category theory
Higher category theory
Category theory and related mathematics